NDG may refer to:

 Notre-Dame-de-Grâce, a neighbourhood in Montreal, Canada
 New Dance Group,  a performing arts organization from New York City, United States
 IATA code for Qiqihar Sanjiazi Airport, China
 National Democratic Gathering, an alliance of Syrian political parties